This is a list of members of the Tasmanian House of Assembly between the 1893 election and the 1897 election.

Party affiliations were relatively loose during the period. In the table below, "Ministerial" relates to supporters of Henry Dobson, who served as Premier of Tasmania until 14 April 1894, and "Liberal" refers to an opposition group which came to support Sir Edward Braddon, who served as Premier for the rest of the term.

Notes
 In December 1893, the election of the Independent member for Cumberland, Don Urquhart, who had won the seat from incumbent member Nicholas John Brown by 12 votes, was declared void. At the close of nominations for the resulting by-election on 24 February 1894, Brown was re-elected unopposed.
 The seat of Montagu was created after the election, and a by-election was held on 2 March 1894 to choose a member for the seat. Don Urquhart won the by-election.
 On 14 April 1894, following the fall of the Dobson government, Edward Braddon was invited to form a government. These members were therefore required to resign and contest ministerial by-elections. Additionally, Sir Philip Fysh opted to transfer from his Legislative Council seat to contest a North Hobart vacancy created by the resignation of Frederick William Piesse from the House. On 24 April 1894, Fysh and Andrew Inglis Clark were returned unopposed, whilst Alfred Pillinger was returned six days later in a contested election. Piesse, meanwhile, ran for and won the Council vacancy caused by Fysh's resignation from that House in a by-election on 8 May 1894.
 In May 1894, Norman Cameron, the Independent member for Deloraine, resigned and recontested his seat in a by-election. He was defeated by Liberal candidate Jonathan Best on 25 May 1894.

Sources
 
 Parliament of Tasmania (2006). The Parliament of Tasmania from 1956

Members of Tasmanian parliaments by term
19th-century Australian politicians